My Town is the third studio album by American country music duo Montgomery Gentry. It was released in 2002 (see 2002 in country music). Certified platinum in the United States, the album produced three consecutive top-five hits on the Billboard country charts with the title track, "Speed", and "Hell Yeah". It is Montgomery Gentry's best-selling album to date, with over 1.1 million units sold.

Track listing

Personnel
Adapted from liner notes.

Al Anderson- electric guitar
Bekka Bramlett- background vocals (track 1)
Pat Buchanan- electric guitar
Eric Darken- percussion
Dan Dugmore- dobro, acoustic guitar, steel guitar
Troy Gentry- lead vocals, background vocals
David Grissom- electric guitar
Wes Hightower- background vocals (track 9)
Mark Hill- bass guitar
Chuck Leavell- keyboards
Eddie Montgomery- lead vocals, background vocals
Greg Morrow- drums
Johnny Neel- harmonica, Hammond organ
Doug Powell- mandolin
Darrell Scott- banjo
Jeffrey Steele- background vocals (track 1)
Curtis Wright- background vocals (tracks 2, 3, 7, 8, 10, 11)

Chart performance

Weekly charts

Year-end charts

Singles

Certifications

References 

2002 albums
Montgomery Gentry albums
Columbia Records albums
Albums produced by Blake Chancey